Edgar Bright Wilson (1874-1953) was an American lawyer and politician. He served as the Speaker of the Tennessee House of Representatives from 1901 to 1903.

Early life
Edgar Brighton Wilson was born in 1874. His father, James A. Wilson, was a veteran of the Confederate States Army during the American Civil War. His mother was Mary Graves. His paternal uncle, Samuel Franklin Wilson, was a Confederate veteran and a judge.

Wilson was educated at the Chapel Hill Academy. He graduated from Cumberland University in 1893. He studied the law under his uncle, and he was admitted to the bar in 1894.

Career
Wilson practised the law in Gallatin, Tennessee from 1894 to 1901. He was a lawyer in Nashville, Tennessee from 1901 onward.

Wilson served as a member of the Tennessee House of Representatives from 1898 to 1903, representing Sumner County. He also served as the Speaker of the House from 1901 to 1903.

Personal life and death
Wilson married Anna Lackey in 1902. He was a Freemason and a member of the Knights of Pythias. He was a Presbyterian. He died in 1953.

References

1874 births
1953 deaths
People from Chapel Hill, Tennessee
Politicians from Nashville, Tennessee
People from Gallatin, Tennessee
Tennessee lawyers
Democratic Party members of the Tennessee House of Representatives